For the fictional character named Cassandra Webb, see Madame Web.

Cassandra Webb is an Australian-American actress. She grew up in Sausalito, California and Moree, New South Wales, graduating in Slavic Language and Literature from the University of California, Berkeley. She was awarded a President's Fellowship to translate and produce three Russian One Acts, including the first English translation and performance of Daniel Harms' Dadaist play with Professors Simon Karlinsky and Andrew Wachtel.

She is the mother of the actress Jessica Wiseman, Charles Wiseman and Nicholas Wiseman. The Australian film producer, Patricia Lovell, is her godmother.

Filmography

References

External links
 

Year of birth missing (living people)
Living people
Australian film actresses
Australian television actresses
Tamalpais High School alumni